Max Graf (1 October 1873 – 24 June 1958) was an Austrian music historian and critic. 

He was born in Vienna, the son of Josef and Regine (Lederer) Graf.  His father was a political writer and editor.

Max was described as the "dean of music critics in Vienna" in the first part of the 20th century.

Career 
He is also notable for his role in the history of psychoanalysis as the father of Little Hans, whose treatment was described by Sigmund Freud.  Max's first wife and Little Hans' mother, Olga Hönig, was one of Freud's patients.

Graf's book Composer and Critic is noted for its amicable style with M. A. Schubart of the New York Times stating, "Dr. Graf has written a charming, comprehensive, intelligent treatise on music criticism, drawing generously on his own large supply of knowledge and experience.... The only major issue which I cannot reach agreement with Dr. Graf is his manner. He is much too polite. No subject in the world deserves more rudeness than music criticism."  Countering this impression, Graf published a deeply critical review of a Metropolitan Opera production produced by his son in 1946.

In the introduction to Composer and Critic, Graf details his original interest in music criticism as having stemmed from attending the lectures of Anton Bruckner in Vienna.

Max was Jewish and fled Vienna for the United States in 1938, where he taught at the New School for Social Research in New York City until 1947, when he returned to Vienna. He died there in 1958.

Works
 Wagner-Probleme, und andere Studien, 1900
 Die Musik im Zeitalter der Renaissance, 1905
 Die innere Werkstatt des Musikers, 1910
 Richard Wagner im "Fliegenden Holländer": ein Beitrag zur Psychologie künstlerischen Schaffens, 1911
 Legend of a musical city, 1945
 Composer and critic: Two hundred years of musical criticism, 1946
 Modern music: Composers and music of our time, 1946
 From Beethoven to Shostakovich: The psychology of the composing process, 1947
 Geschichte und Geist der modernen Musik, 1953
 Die Wiener Oper, 1955

See also
 Psychoanalysis and music

References

1873 births
1958 deaths
Austrian male composers
Austrian composers
Austrian music critics
Austrian musicologists
Analysands of Sigmund Freud